There are several rivers named Santo Antônio River.

 San Antonio River (South America) on the border between Argentina and Brazil

Brazil
 Santo Antônio River (Amapá)
 Santo Antônio River (Bahia)
 Santo Antônio River (Doce River tributary)
 Santo Antônio River (Itaúnas River tributary)
 Santo Antônio River (Paraná)
 Santo Antônio River (Rio de Janeiro)
 Santo Antônio River (Do Sono River tributary)
 Santo Antônio River (Santa Catarina)
 Santo Antônio River (Tocantins)
 Santo Antônio Grande River